Gibson Township is the name of some places in the U.S. state of Pennsylvania:
Gibson Township, Cameron County, Pennsylvania
Gibson Township, Susquehanna County, Pennsylvania

Pennsylvania township disambiguation pages